George Grenfell (21 August 1849, in Sancreed, Cornwall – 1 July 1906, in Basoko, Congo Free State (now the Democratic Republic of the Congo) was a Cornish missionary and explorer.

Early years
Grenfell was born at Sancreed, near Penzance, Cornwall. After the family moved to Birmingham he was educated at a branch of King Edward's school. Though his parents were Anglicans he soon joined Heneage Street Baptist Chapel, where he was admitted to membership by baptism on 7 Nov.1864.

Influenced by the likes of David Livingstone, Grenfell's ambition was to become a missionary so in September 1873 he entered the Baptist College, Stokes Croft, Bristol. On 10 Nov. 1874 the Baptist Missionary Society accepted him for work in Africa.

In 1875, he went as a Baptist missionary to Cameroon, West Africa, with Alfred Saker (1814–80).  In 1877 he relocated to Victoria and explored the Wouri River and in the following year he ascended Mongo ma Loba Mountain.  From 1880 onwards he did some important work in exploring little-known rivers of the Congo Basin.

Congo explorations
In 1881, cooperating with the Rev Thomas J. Comber and others, he established a chain of missions at Musuko, Vivi, Isangila, Manyanga, and other points, and in 1884, in a small steam vessel, he explored the Congo to the equator.  He established headquarters at Arthington, near Leopoldville, in 1884, and launched on Stanley Pool a river steam vessel, the Peace, in which he explored the Kivu, the Kwango, and the Kasai rivers, discovered the Ruki, or Black River, and ascended the Mubangi for 200 miles (320 km) to Grenfell Falls, at lat. 4° 40' N.  
In 1885 he explored with Curt von François other tributaries of the Congo, notably the Busira, along which he found Pygmy Batwa peoples. In the following year he examined the Kasai, the Sankuru, and the Luebo and Lulua, and made careful records of the Bakuba and Bakete tribes.  He was awarded in 1887 the Patron's Medal of the Royal Geographical Society for his explorations in the Cameroons and Congo.

In 1891 he was appointed a plenipotentiary for Belgium to delimit the boundary line between the Belgian and Portuguese possessions along the Luanda frontier.  In 1903 he protested to King Leopold against consistent refusal of the Congo Free State authorities to countenance further Baptist advance beyond Yakusu on the Upper Congo, but with no effect.
From 1893 to 1900 Grenfell remained chiefly at Bolobo on the Congo, where a strong mission station was established. After a visit to England in 1900, he started for a systematic exploration of the Aruwimi River and by November 1902 had reached Mawambi, about eighty miles from the western extreme of the Uganda protectorate.

Last years

Between 1903 and 1906 Grenfell was busy with a new station at Yalemba, fifteen miles east of the confluence of the Aruwimi with the Congo.
Meanwhile, he found difficulty in obtaining building sites from the Congo Free State, which accorded them freely to Roman Catholics. He grew convinced of the Catholic character of Belgian administration, in which he had previously trusted. In 1903 King Leopold despatched at Grenfell's entreaty a commission of inquiry, before which he gave evidence, but its report gave him little satisfaction. Grenfell died after a bad attack of blackwater fever at Basoko on 1 July 1906.

A memorial tablet was unveiled in Heneage Street Baptist Chapel, Birmingham, on 24 September 1907. During major 1950s clearance of the area for redevelopment Heneage Street Baptist was closed. The tablet was recovered and was moved to a new Chapel in north-east Birmingham named in his honour.

Publications
 Life on the Congo, by William Holman Bentley; with an introduction by George Grenfell. London: The Religious Tract Society, 1887.
 The upper Congo, Geographical Journal, Bd. 20 (1902)
  Exploration of the Tributaries of the Congo, between Leopoldville and Stanley Falls Proceedings of the Royal Geographical Society and Monthly Record of Geography, vol. 8, no. 10, Royal Geographical Society (with the Institute of British Geographers), Wiley, 1886, pp. 627–34,
 The Cameroon District, West Africa,  Royal Geographical Society, London, 1882

References

 Sir Harry Johnston: George Grenfell and the Congo. 2 Volume, London: Hutchinson, 1908. (A history and description of the Congo Independent State and adjoining districts of Congoland, together with some account of the native peoples and their languages, the fauna and flora; and similar notes on the Cameroons and the island of Fernando Pô, the whole founded on the diaries and researches of the late Rev George Grenfell, B.M.S., F.R.G.S.; and on the records of the British Baptist Missionary Society; and on additional information contributed by the author, by the Rev. Lawson Forfeitt, Mr. Emil Torday, and others). Reprint, New York: Kraus, 19XX.
 George Hawker: The life of George Grenfell, Congo missionary and explorer. London: The Religious Tract Society, 1909.
 Shirley J. Dickins: Grenfell of the Congo. Pioneer, missionary, and explorer. London: Sunday School Union, 1910.
 Harry Lathey Hemmens: George Grenfell: pioneer in Congo. London: Student Christian Movement, 1927.
 Robert A. Bickers, Rosemary Seton: Missionary Encounters. Sources and issues, Curzon Press, 1995.
 

1849 births
1906 deaths
Baptist missionaries in Cameroon
Baptist missionaries in the Democratic Republic of the Congo
Explorers of Africa
English Baptist missionaries
Cornish evangelicals
Cornish Baptists
Explorers from Cornwall
British expatriates in Cameroon
British expatriates in the Democratic Republic of the Congo
Cornish Christian missionaries
English evangelicals
British evangelicals
19th-century Baptists